The Zotye V10 was a five-door, five- to eight-seater Microvan made by Zotye, a Chinese car manufacturer.

Overview

The Zotye V10 is Zotye's first entry into the microvan market with prices starting from 39,800 yuan and ending at 50,800 yuan.. The Zotye V10 has only one engine option which is a 1.2 liter inline-four engine producing 85 hp and 105nm mated to a 5-speed manual gearbox.

Zotye Jietai
The Zotye Jietai (捷泰) was launched in October 2015. The Jietai is the electric version of the V10 microvan, developed for the logistics industry. The Jietai utilizes the exact same body and dimensions of the Zotye V10 while replacing the power house with a 29kW battery weighing 310kg, resulting in the full vehicle weight reaching 1400kg. According to Zotye officials, the maximum range is 210km and the top speed is 105km/hr.

References

External links
chinamobil.ru listed details

Microvans
Minivans
Cars introduced in 2011
2010s cars
Cars of China